Steensby Glacier is a major glacier in northern Greenland. 

This glacier was first mapped in 1917 during Knud Rasmussen's 1916–1918 Second Thule Expedition to north Greenland and was named after Danish ethnologist Hans Peder Steensby.

Geography 
The Steensby Glacier originates in the Greenland Ice Sheet. It is roughly north–south oriented and has its terminus between Nyeboe Land and Warming Land at the head of the Saint George Fjord. The fjord is free from ice in the summer, and the glacier forms a floating tongue within the fjord that has shrunk since it was measured in 1963.

Bibliography
Anthony K. Higgins, North Greenland Glacier Velocities and Calf Ice Production

See also
List of glaciers in Greenland

References

External links
Steensby Glacier Calving Event and Retreat, Northern Greenland

Glaciers of Greenland